Miguel Godoy (born 7 May 1983) is a Paraguayan professional footballer who plays as a midfielder for the Paraguayan club Sportivo Luqueño.

External links 
 
 

1983 births
Living people
Paraguayan footballers
Paraguayan expatriate footballers
Paraguayan Primera División players
Categoría Primera A players
Deportivo Cali footballers
Sportivo Luqueño players
Deportivo Capiatá players
Cerro Porteño (Presidente Franco) footballers
Expatriate footballers in Colombia
Association football midfielders